René Pierre Charles Tartara (14 November 1881 – 3 September 1922) was a French freestyle swimmer and water polo player. He competed at the 1900 Summer Olympics in water polo and two swimming events, and won a bronze medal in the 200 m team swimming.

References

External links
 

1881 births
1922 deaths
Sportspeople from Lille
French male freestyle swimmers
Swimmers at the 1900 Summer Olympics
Water polo players at the 1900 Summer Olympics
Olympic bronze medalists for France
Olympic bronze medalists in swimming
Olympic swimmers of France
Olympic water polo players of France
Medalists at the 1900 Summer Olympics
French male water polo players